{{DISPLAYTITLE:C22H26FN3O}}
The molecular formula C22H26FN3O (molar mass: 367.460 g/mol, exact mass: 367.2060 u) may refer to:

 5F-CUMYL-P7AICA
 5F-CUMYL-PINACA (SGT-25)

Molecular formulas